Ron Cottrell (born October 11, 1960) is an American basketball coach. He is the head men's basketball coach at Houston Christian University in Houston, Texas. After beginning his career as a student assistant on Nolan Richardson's staff at Arkansas, Cottrell took over as Athletic Director and head men's basketball coach at Houston Christian, then known as Houston Baptist. From 1998-07, the Huskies made the NAIA men's basketball tournament each season. On December 7, 2021, Cottrell earned his 500th win as a head coach.

Career head coaching record

References

External links
 Ron Cottrell’s Husky Basketball Camps - Houston Baptist University - Houston, Texas

1960 births
Living people
Basketball coaches from Texas
Arkansas Razorbacks men's basketball coaches
College men's basketball head coaches in the United States
Houston Christian Huskies men's basketball coaches
Junior college men's basketball coaches in the United States
Place of birth missing (living people)
University of Arkansas alumni
Westbury High School (Houston) alumni